The 2013–14 Basketball League Belgium Division I, for sponsorship reasons the 2013–14 Ethias League, was the 87th season top tier basketball league in Belgium. The season started on October 4, 2013 and finished on June 9, 2014. Telenet BC Oostende won their 3rd straight title by beating Okapi Aalstar 3–2 in the Finals. Dušan Djordjević was named Most Valuable Player.

Teams

Kangoeroes Basket Willebroek and Basic-Fit Brussels made their first Ethias League appearances after playing in the 2e Nationale in the 2012–13 season. Both clubs received a C-licence, which allows the teams to use a lower budget and doesn't allow them to play European but does to participate for three years. After those years they have to get an A or B-licence.

Regular season 

|}

Playoffs

Finals

Awards
Most Valuable Player
 Dušan Djordjević (Telenet BC Oostende)
Star of the Coaches
 Talor Battle (Belfius Mons-Hainaut)
Belgian Player of the Year
 Maxime De Zeeuw (Port of Antwerp Giants)
Coach of the Year
 Fulvio Bastinini (Liège Basket)
Most Promising Player
 Pierre-Antoine Gillet (Telenet BC Oostende)

Statistical leaders

Performance Index Rating

Points

Rebounds

Assists

Steals

Blocks

References

External links 
 ethiasleague.com

Basketball League Belgium Division I seasons
Belgian
Lea